Mortoza Hossain is an Indian politician and doctor belonging to All India Trinamool Congress. He was elected as MLA of Vidhan Sabha Constituency in 1982 and 2006. He was a minister of West Bengal Government.

References

Living people
Trinamool Congress politicians from West Bengal
West Bengal MLAs 1982–1987
West Bengal MLAs 2006–2011
Medical doctors from West Bengal
Year of birth missing (living people)